Rundle Academy is an Independent School in Calgary, Alberta, part of Rundle College Society, and specializes in the instruction of students who have learning disabilities.  Students at Rundle Academy typically have an average to above average intelligence but struggle in one or more areas of learning.  As a result, the students typically underachieve in one of their core academic areas.

The school has a population of 200 students in Grades 4-12.  The classes at Rundle Academy range from 6 students per class in Elementary to 10 students per class in High School.  Teachers utilize differentiated instruction and differentiated assessment to help their students achieve their personal best.  All classrooms are equipped with assistive technology to help students.  These technologies include: ActivBoards, SMART Boards, Neo personal word processors, laptop computers and desktop computers. Rundle Academy follows the Alberta Learning Curriculum and aims to have each of its students graduate with a High School Diploma.

Athletics 
Some of the sports offered to students are:

 Badminton
 Basketball
 Cheerleading
 Cross Country
 Football
 Golf
 Rugby
 Soccer
 Track and Field
 Ultimate Frisbee
 Volleyball
 Wrestling

External links 
Rundle College Society
Learn Alberta
Learning Disabilities Association

Elementary schools in Calgary
Middle schools in Calgary
High schools in Calgary
Private schools in Alberta
Educational institutions established in 1996
1996 establishments in Alberta